The Daewoo Telecom K7 is a 9×19mm Parabellum submachine gun with an integral suppressor used by the Republic of Korea Armed Forces. It is based on the Daewoo K1A assault rifle, but is simplified by utilizing a blowback action rather than the gas impingement system of its parent firearm.

It was first displayed outside of Korea in the United Arab Emirates at the IDEX (International Defence Exhibition) 2003 convention.

The K7 is currently manufactured by S&T Motiv.

History

Despite the fact that the H&K MP5SD6 was already in service with the Republic of Korea Armed Forces by the time the K7 reached production status, most of the special forces relied on unconventional weapons during covert operations due to high price of imported and domestically produced SMGs. Due to the substantial cost of the importation and production of such weapons, the Republic of Korea Army Special Warfare Command requested the development of an integrally suppressed submachine gun that would be less expensive to import or manufacture than the MP5SD6.

The Defense Agency for Technology and Quality, a part of the Agency for Defense Development, and Daewoo Telecom, a subbranch of Daewoo Group, officially started development in April 1998, finishing the project in December 2000.

In 2020, Iran revealed an indigenous submachine gun that has the design based on the K7. It was also seen at the Victory Day National Arms Exhibition on May 24, 2021, with suppressed and non-suppressed versions.

Design
The K7 does not use the direct gas impingement system of the K1A. Instead, the K7 utilizes a simple blow-back system. A 30-round vertical box magazine is used and it can also use the 30-round magazines taken from the IMI Uzi or 32-round magazines from the Beretta Model 12. As the magazine well of the K1A was retained, there are internal accommodations for the smaller 9 mm magazine. There are 3 firing modes, single shot, a 3-round burst and fully automatic. However, prolonged fully automatic fire has been shown to damage and degrade the baffles within the integral suppressor. As a result of the light bolt, a cyclic rate of fire of 1150-rounds per minute is achieved.

An integral suppressor is featured on the K7, which leaves users the option to use standard 9mm Parabellum ammo instead of using subsonic ammo. The K7's upper receiver is based on that of the K2, albeit slightly modified. The hammer/fire control unit and telescopic stock are also derived from those of the K1.

It can outfitted with a PK Designlab-made weaponlight with built-in picatinny railing.

As the K7 was developed from the Daewoo K1A, it features parts that can be interchanged with those of the K1 and vice versa.

Suppressor
The suppressor reduces the pressure of the gas produced during discharge, and by extension, reduces the amount of noise generated. In addition, the suppressor significantly distorts the sound of the gunshot so that it is very difficult to pinpoint the location of the shooter. Per shot, the mean average of noise generated by the K7 is approximately 111.5 dB.

Users

: used by SWADS
: Komando Pasukan Katak (Kopaska) tactical diver group and Komando Pasukan Khusus (Kopassus) special forces group. As of 2019, a SIPRI small arms report indicates around 1,786 K7s were transferred to Indonesia.
: Used by ROKASWC and ROKNSWF.

Trial use
: A 2019 SIPRI small arms report indicate that two K7s were transferred to Thailand.

See also
 Daewoo Precision Industries K1
 S&T Daewoo XK9

References

Bibliography

External links

S&T Daewoo Homepage

9mm Parabellum submachine guns
Post–Cold War weapons of South Korea
Firearms of Korea
Silenced firearms
Military equipment introduced in the 2000s